Travellingua, also known as the Language and Culture Explorers' Club, is a project which was supported by the European Commission under Socrates Lingua 1 (Promotion of Language Learning) action.
The project was implemented from November 1, 2006 to September 30, 2008.

Outputs
The official website (www.travellingua.eu) has 5 main parts:
 LEARN: A linguistic part with the Phrase book and audio material in 5 languages (English, Lithuanian, Latvian, Danish and Swedish);
 EXPLORE: a part which gives basic information about 4 countries, their cultures and languages (Lithuania, Latvia, Denmark and Sweden);
 SHARE: a part where the material (phrase book and MP3 files) can be downloaded for free and learners share their knowledge and experience in language learning and travelling;
 CONSULT: a linguistic part where any learner can ask a general question about language learning or a specific language (Lithuanian, Latvian, Danish or Swedish) and get a professional answer from a linguist. Answers then are posted for the general public;
 CONTINUE STUDIES: a part which gives useful links (with free linguistic resources, EU-sponsored linguistic projects are presented among them) for those who decide to continue self-studying Lithuanian, Latvian, Danish or Swedish or to find more information about travelling.

Results
As a result of this project:
 there will be more people having survival-level linguistic competence of the target languages and being able to use it while travelling or working abroad;
 there will be more people self-studying other European languages (especially from the Germanic group);
 less popular European countries and languages will be promoted.

Project members

Project coordinator
Eurolingvija Training center 
Sauliu str. 21, LT-92233, Klaipeda, Lithuania 
www.eurolingvija.eu

Project partners
Forbundet Kommunikation og Sprog (The Union of Communication and Language Professionals) 
Forbundet Kommunikation og Sprog, Skindergade 45–47, Postboks 2246, 1019 København K 
www.kommunikationogsprog.dk 

Videnscenter for Integration (Resource Center For Integration) 
Havneparken 2, DK-7100, Vejle, Denmark 
www.vifin.dk

Mittuniversitetet (Mid Sweden University) 
S-871 88 Härnösand, Sweden 
www.miun.se

Klaipėdos Turizmo ir Kultūros Informacijos Centras (Klaipeda Tourism and Culture Information Center) 
Turgaus g. 7, LT-91247, Klaipėda, Lithuania 
www.klaipedainfo.lt

See also 
Multilingualism

Language education
2006 establishments in Europe
2008 establishments in Europe